Fatty's Day Off is a 1913 American short comedy film featuring Fatty Arbuckle.  Prints and/or fragments were found in the Dawson Film Find in 1978.

Cast
 Roscoe 'Fatty' Arbuckle
 Charles Avery
 Minta Durfee

See also
 Fatty Arbuckle filmography

References

External links

1913 films
1913 comedy films
1913 short films
Silent American comedy films
American silent short films
American black-and-white films
Films directed by Wilfred Lucas
American comedy short films
1910s American films
1910s English-language films